Conor A. Gearty  (born November 1957) is the Professor of Human Rights Law at LSE Department of Law. From 2002 to 2009, he was Director of the Centre for the Study of Human Rights at the London School of Economics. His academic research focuses primarily on civil liberties, terrorism and human rights.

Conor Gearty was born in Ireland and graduated in law from University College Dublin before moving to Wolfson College, Cambridge in 1980 to study for a master's degree and then for a PhD. He became a fellow of Emmanuel College, Cambridge in 1983. In 1990, he moved to the school of law at King’s College London, where he was first a senior lecturer, then a reader and finally (from 1995) a professor.

Gearty is also a practising barrister and a founder member of Matrix Chambers. He has also been a visiting professor at Boston University, the University of Richmond and the University of New South Wales. He received honorary degrees from Brunel University and Roehampton University.

Background
Originally from Abbeylara, County Longford, Ireland, he was educated at Castleknock College before going to University College Dublin as an undergraduate and Cambridge University as a post-graduate. He had significant debating success in University, twice winning the Irish Times debating competition and serving as Auditor of the University College Dublin Law Society.

Bibliography

Books
On Fantasy Island. Britain, Europe, and Human Rights (2016)
Liberty and Security (2013)

Essays on Human Rights and Terrorism (2008) Cameron May
Civil Liberties (2007) Clarendon Publishing
Can Human Rights Survive? (2006) Hamlyn Lectures
Principles of Human Rights Adjudication (2004) Oxford University Press
(with Keith Ewing)The Struggle for Civil Liberties
(with Keith Ewing) Freedom under Thatcher: Civil Liberties in Modern Britain (1990) Oxford University Press

Essays and reporting

"When it can be right to do wrong", The Tablet (11 October 2008)

References

External links
Gearty homepage
Audio recording of lecture (Human Rights: seductive, dangerous, and necessary) given in the UCD Humanities Institute (January 2011)
The Rights' Future - an online collaboration

Academics of King's College London
Irish legal scholars
Living people
Academics of the London School of Economics
People from County Longford
Alumni of Wolfson College, Cambridge
Members of Matrix Chambers
Alumni of University College Dublin
People educated at Castleknock College
Fellows of Emmanuel College, Cambridge
Fellows of the British Academy
1957 births